Chang Chun-hung (born 17 May 1938) is a Taiwanese politician.

Political career
Chang was a member of the Kuomintang until 1973, when he left to join the Tangwai movement and won his first political office, a seat on the Taipei City Council. He served until 1977, when he was named to the Taiwan Provincial Consultative Council. During this period, Chang, Kang Ning-hsiang and Huang Shin-chieh published Taiwan Political Review, an opposition magazine. Chang also edited another Tangwai publication, The Intellectual. In 1979, Chang helped establish Formosa Magazine and served as the publication's chief editor. The Kaohsiung Incident occurred later that year, and Chang was sentenced to twelve years imprisonment on charges of sedition. He was released on 30 May 1987, and became secretary general of the Democratic Progressive Party the next year. In 1991, Chang was elected to the National Assembly. He resigned his seat to pursue a position as representative of Taipei South. Chang retained his position in the Legislative Yuan via party list proportional representation until 2005.

Personal
Chang is married to fellow politician Hsu Jung-shu.

References

1938 births
Living people
Politicians of the Republic of China on Taiwan from Nantou County
Party List Members of the Legislative Yuan
Democratic Progressive Party Members of the Legislative Yuan
Taipei Members of the Legislative Yuan
Members of the 2nd Legislative Yuan
Members of the 3rd Legislative Yuan
Members of the 4th Legislative Yuan
Members of the 5th Legislative Yuan
Prisoners and detainees of Taiwan
Taiwanese politicians convicted of crimes
Taiwanese prisoners and detainees
Taiwanese political party founders
People convicted of sedition
Taiwanese editors